The 2016 James Madison Dukes football team represented James Madison University during the 2016 NCAA Division I FCS football season. They were led by first year head coach Mike Houston and played their home games at Bridgeforth Stadium and Zane Showker Field. They were a member of the Colonial Athletic Association (CAA). They finished the season 14–1 overall with an 8–0 mark in CAA play to win the conference title. They received the automatic bid to the FCS playoffs, where they defeated New Hampshire, Sam Houston State, and five-time defending champions North Dakota State to advance to the National Championship Game, where they defeated Youngstown State. This was their first national championship since 2004.

Previous season
In 2015, the Dukes finished with a record of 9–3, 6–2 in CAA play, to finish in a first-place tie with Richmond and William & Mary. They received an at-large bid to the FCS Playoffs and hosted Colgate in the second round. The Dukes lost to the Raiders, 44–38, and were eliminated from the playoffs.

Schedule

Roster

Game summaries

Morehead State

Central Connecticut

at North Carolina

at Maine

Delaware

William & Mary

at New Hampshire

Rhode Island

at Richmond

at Villanova

Elon

FCS Playoffs

Second Round–New Hampshire

Quarterfinals–Sam Houston State

Semifinals–North Dakota State

It was this game that ended NDSU's streak of five consecutive FCS titles.

Championship–Youngstown State

Ranking movements

References

James Madison
James Madison Dukes football seasons
NCAA Division I Football Champions
Colonial Athletic Association football champion seasons
James Madison
James Madison Dukes football